Jordan Alan Courtney-Perkins (born 6 November 2002) is an Australian professional footballer who  plays as a defender for Brisbane Roar, on loan from Raków Częstochowa.

Club career

Brisbane Roar
Courtney-Perkins was part of the 2018-19 Y-League championship winning Brisbane Roar Youth team. He started and played the full 90 minutes as the Young Roar beat Western Sydney Wanderers Youth 3–1 in the 2019 Y-League Grand Final on 1 February 2019.

On 5 August 2019, Courtney-Perkins signed a scholarship contract with the Roar for the 2019–20 season. Two days later, he made his professional debut in a Round of 32 clash against Sydney FC in the 2019 FFA Cup, playing a full game in a 2–0 victory. In doing so, he became the youngest player to play for the Brisbane Roar at 16 years, 9 months and 1 days.

Raków Częstochowa
On 29 June 2021, it was announced that Courtney-Perkins would join the Polish side Raków Częstochowa, becoming the first Australian to play in Poland's Ekstraklasa since Jake McGing. He made his debut for the club on 1 August, in the game against Jagiellonia Białystok as a starter in its 0–3 away defeat.

Loan to Warta
On 5 February 2022, Courtney-Perkins was loaned until the end of the season to another Ekstraklasa side Warta Poznań.

International career
Courtney-Perkins was first selected for the Joeys in 2017. He was subsequently selected in the squad for the 2018 AFC U-16 Championship, where he started in the Joeys' 3–2 quarter final win over Indonesia, a win which qualified Australia for the 2019 FIFA U-17 World Cup. On 2 October 2019, Courtney-Perkins was selected in the Joeys squad for the 2019 FIFA U-17 World Cup. He started in all of the Joeys' Group B games, conceding a penalty as the Joey's fought back to secure a 2–2 draw against Hungary. He started in their Round of 16 clash with France on 7 November 2019, losing 4–0 and being eliminated from the competition.

Personal life
Courtney-Perkins attended Anglican Church Grammar School and was a member of the First XI who won the 2019 GPS Football Premiership, the school's first win in the competition.

Honours
Brisbane Roar
Y-League: 2018–19

Raków Częstochowa
Polish Cup: 2021–22

References

External links

2002 births
Living people
Australian soccer players
Association football defenders
Brisbane Roar FC players
Raków Częstochowa players
Warta Poznań players
National Premier Leagues players
A-League Men players
Ekstraklasa players
III liga players
Expatriate footballers in Poland
Australian expatriate soccer players
Australian expatriate sportspeople in Poland
Soccer players from Adelaide
Australia youth international soccer players
Australia under-23 international soccer players